Bryan Knight (born January 22, 1979) is a former American football linebacker in the National Football League (NFL). He was drafted by the Chicago Bears in the fifth round of the 2002 NFL Draft. He played college football at Pittsburgh.

Knight was also a member of the Carolina Panthers.

References

1979 births
Living people
American football linebackers
Pittsburgh Panthers football players
Chicago Bears players
Carolina Panthers players